The 1962–63 Liga Alef season saw Hapoel Ramat Gan win the title and promotion to Liga Leumit.

Hapoel Lod and Maccabi Sha'arayim were also promoted.

The following season, after eight consecutive seasons as a nationwide division, Liga Alef was divided once more into two regional divisions, North and South.

Final table

References
Safed and Maccabi Ramla missed the train Maariv, 30.5.63, Historical Jewish Press 

Liga Alef seasons
Israel
2